Amber Beach was an annual music festival in Kaliningrad Oblast, Russia.

Renditions

2010 

The first festival was held in Yantarny from July 23 to 25, 2010. It was headlined by Everything Is Made In China, Vopli Vidoplyasova, Dieselboy, Covenant and Timo Maas. The event was attended by about 3000–4000 people.

2011 

In 2011, the festival was held in Zelenogradsk on July 15 to 16. The headliners were Paul Oakenfold, SASH! and Smash HI-FI. There were about 5000 attendees.

2012 

In 2012, the festival was held in Zelenogradsk on July 13 to 14. The headliners were Scooter, Ronski Speed, and Tantsy Minus.

2013 

In 2013, the festival was held in Zelenogradsk on August 30. The headliners were Westbam and Solarstone.

2014-2015 
The festival was canceled in 2014 and was not held 2015.

2016 
In 2016, the festival returned to Yantarny and took place from July 28 to July 31. The headliners were Gus Gus, Enter Shikari, and Brainstorm.

See also

List of electronic music festivals
Live electronic music

References

Further reading
 TV story in Russian, Kaskad ITRC, 2010
 Amber Beach is on the short list of best Russian festivals, Billboard
 Paul Oakenfold talking on Amber Beach
 Oakenfold on press conference, Radisson Kaliningrad
 Video from Klops.ru with report on 3rd Amber Beach festival

External links

Music festivals established in 2010
Electronic music festivals in Russia